Devil's Fall is a cave in the British Overseas Territory of Gibraltar.

Description
This cave is in the cliff face between Camp Bay and Little Bay. The cave is one of few identified as being of particular archaeological interest. The cave is a Class A listed building as designated by the Government of Gibraltar's Gibraltar Heritage Trust Act of 1989.

See also
List of caves in Gibraltar

References

Caves of Gibraltar